The Rescuers is a 1977 animated film from Walt Disney Animation Studios.

The Rescuers may also refer to:

The Rescuers (book), the book that the 1977 film was partially based on
The Rescuers Down Under, the sequel to the 1977 film

See also

 Rescuers (disambiguation)
 The Rescue (disambiguation)